Dixon House may refer to:

Places in the United States
(by state then city)
Dixon–Markle House, Aspen, Colorado, listed on the National Register of Historic Places in Pitkin County, Colorado
S. P. Dixon Farm, Newark, Delaware, listed on the National Register of Historic Places in New Castle County, Delaware
James Dixon House, Milford, Kansas, listed on the National Register of Historic Places in Geary County, Kansas
Dixon House (Prairieville, Louisiana), listed on the National Register of Historic Places in Ascension Parish, Louisiana
Dixon Building, Natchez, Mississippi, listed on the National Register of Historic Places in Adams County, Mississippi
Dixon-Duncan Block, Missoula, Montana, listed on the National Register of Historic Places in Missoula County, Montana
Dixon House (Poughkeepsie, New York), listed on the NRHP in Dutchess County, New York
James Dixon Farm, Boonton, New Jersey, listed on the National Register of Historic Places in Morris County, New Jersey
Dixon-Leftwich-Murphy House, Greensboro, North Carolina, listed on the National Register of Historic Places in Guilford County, North Carolina 
Dixon Hall Apartments, Cleveland, Ohio, listed on the National Register of Historic Places in Cleveland, Ohio
Dixon-Globe Opera House-Robinson-Schwenn Building, Hamilton, Ohio, listed on the National Register of Historic Places in  Butler County, Ohio
Dixon-Moore House, Dallas, Texas, listed on the National Register of Historic Places in Dallas County, Texas
Christopher F. Dixon, Jr., House, Payson, Utah, listed on the National Register of Historic Places in Utah County, Utah
John Dixon House, Payson, Utah, listed on the National Register of Historic Places in Utah County, Utah
Maynard and Edith Hamlin Dixon House and Studio, Mt. Carmel, Utah, listed on the National Register of Historic Places in Kane County, Utah
Dixon (Shacklefords, Virginia), listed on the National Register of Historic Places in King and Queen County, Virginia

Other
Dixon Building, in Toronto, Ontario, Canada
 Dixon House Band, a prog-rock/pop group based in Seattle in the late 1970s
 E. Dixon House (born 1950), Musician, singer, songwriter, composer